Onward is an unincorporated community located in Sharkey County, Mississippi, at the junction of Mississippi Highway 1 and U.S. Route 61.

Onward had a post office from about 1879 to 1975.  The post office was housed in Onward Store in the early to mid-twentieth century.  A state historical highway marker on the grounds of Onward Store commemorates the creation of the Teddy Bear.  In 1902, former United States President Theodore Roosevelt refused to shoot a captive bear during a bear hunt at nearby Smedes Plantation.  Subsequent political cartoons inspired the creation of the Teddy Bear.

Gallery

References

Unincorporated communities in Sharkey County, Mississippi
Unincorporated communities in Mississippi